Varda Caivano (born 1971) is an Argentinian artist who lives and works in London, England.

Born in Buenos Aires, Caivano graduated Goldsmiths University, London in the early 2000s, having previously studied biology and art history at the University of Buenos Aires. She received a master's degree in art from the Royal College of Art, London, in 2004.

Her work is included in the Zabludowicz Collection and the Arts Council Collection, United Kingdom

References

Living people
1971 births
20th-century American women artists
21st-century American women artists